Dennis John Lillie (born 28 October 1945) is a former Australian cricketer. A leg spin bowler he played in the Queensland state team 17 times between 1966 and 1981. He was educated at the Anglican Church Grammar School in Brisbane.

Lillie's career partly overlapped with that of Australian fast bowler and ICC Cricket Hall of Fame inductee Dennis Lillee.  The two similarly, but not exactly, named players never appeared together in the starting lineups of the same game, however Lillie was twelfth man in a Queensland v Western Australia Sheffield Shield game during the 1980–81 season, and in fact caught Lillee in the first innings of that game. The following line appears from that scorecard: DK Lillee c sub (DJ Lillie) b GS Chappell 11

In a South Australia v Queensland match in 1982, David Hookes hit four consecutive sixes, and 28 runs in an over, off Lillie’s bowling.

References

External links
 

1945 births
Living people
Australian cricketers
Queensland cricketers
Cricketers from Brisbane
People educated at Anglican Church Grammar School